Fifth batch of declared historical buildings in Hangzhou represent buildings considered important in the city relating to the arts, science, history, and/or culture. Despite Hangzhou's urbanization over the last century, some of the buildings were constructed during the Qing dynasty, with others having been built more recently in the 1960s and 1980s. Although some of the declared historical buildings have attempted to be destroyed in the past, new regulations from the Hangzhou municipal government have been introduced to greater protect the listed buildings since 2010.

On March 22, 2010, forty-three buildings were declared as historically important, and were officially considered such by the creation of the fifth batch of declared historical buildings.

References: 

Buildings and structures in Hangzhou